General elections were held in Liberia in 1927. In the presidential election the result was a victory for Charles D. B. King of the True Whig Party, who was re-elected for a third term after defeating Thomas J. Faulkner of the People's Party.

The elections were referred to as "the most rigged ever" by Francis Johnson-Morris, a modern head of the country's National Elections Commission, and also made it into the Guinness Book of Records as the most fraudulent election ever reported in history. Despite there being fewer than 15,000 registered voters, King received around 240,000 votes (according to the official falsified results), compared to 9,000 for Faulkner, theoretically resulting in a voter turnout that was in excess of 1,660%.

Results

Aftermath
Following the election, Faulkner accused members of the True Whig Party government of using slave labor at home and selling slaves to the Spanish colony of Fernando Po, as well as involving the Army in the process. Despite the government's denials and a refusal to cooperate, the League of Nations established the "International Commission of Inquiry into the Existence of Slavery and Forced Labor in the Republic of Liberia", under the chairmanship of British jurist Cuthbert Christy, to determine the extent of the problem. U.S. president Herbert Hoover briefly suspended relations to press Monrovia into compliance. In 1930, the committee's report was published, and although it could not substantiate charges of slavery and forced labor, it implicated government officials, including both King and vice president Allen Yancy of profiting from forced labor, which it equated to slavery. There were also suggestions about putting Liberia into trusteeship. As a result, the House of Representatives began impeachment procedures against King, who quickly resigned. He was succeeded by Edwin Barclay. Faulkner contested the 1931 elections, but lost again.

References

Liberia
1927 in Liberia
Elections in Liberia
May 1927 events
Electoral fraud
Guinness World Records
Election and referendum articles with incomplete results